{{DISPLAYTITLE:C48H24}}
The molecular formula C48H24 (molar mass: 600.70 g/mol, exact mass: 600.1878 u) may refer to:

 Hexa-cata-hexabenzocoronene
 
 Kekulene

Molecular formulas